Jaroslav Staněk (born 24 February 1940 in Opava-Podvihov) is a former male international table tennis player from Czechoslovakia.

Table tennis career
He won a bronze medal at the 1967 World Table Tennis Championships with Vladimir Miko.

See also
 List of table tennis players
 List of World Table Tennis Championships medalists

References

Czech male table tennis players
Living people
World Table Tennis Championships medalists
1940 births
Sportspeople from Opava